The 2021 CAA women's soccer tournament was the postseason women's soccer tournament for the Colonial Athletic Association held from November 4 through November 7, 2021. The tournament was held at Rudd Field in Elon, North Carolina. The four-team single-elimination tournament consisted of two rounds based on seeding from regular season conference play. The defending champions were the Elon Phoenix, who were unable to defend their title, after not qualifying for the tournament and finishing fifth in the regular season standings.  The Hofstra Pride won the tournament by defeating Northeastern 2–1 in the final. The conference tournament title was the seventh overall for the Hofstra women's soccer program and the sixth overall for head coach Simon Riddiough.  Both Hofstra and Riddiough have won four of the last five CAA Tournaments. As tournament champions, Hofstra earned the CAA's automatic berth into the 2021 NCAA Division I Women's Soccer Tournament.

Seeding 
Four CAA schools participated in the tournament. Teams were seeded by conference record.  No tiebreakers were required as each team finished on a unique points total.

Bracket

Source:

Schedule

Semifinals

Final

Statistics

Goalscorers

All-Tournament team

Source:

MVP in bold

References 

Colonial Athletic Association women's soccer tournament
2021 Colonial Athletic Association women's soccer season